Wheelchair rugby was first contested at the Summer Paralympics as a demonstration sport in 1996. It became an official medal-awarding sport in 2000 and has been competed at every Summer Paralympics since then. Only one event, mixed team, is held.

Tournaments

Medal table
Updated after the 2020 Summer Paralympics

Participating nations 
Four nations - United States, Canada, Australia and Great Britain have appeared in every wheelchair rugby Paralympic tournament since its introduction. The 1996 tournament was considered a demonstration event, but unlike the Olympics, medals were awarded and counted in the main medals table.

The final placement for each team in each tournament is shown in the following tables.

See also 
Rugby at the Summer Olympics

References 

 

 

 
Wheelchair rugby competitions
Sports at the Summer Paralympics